Miero ("Outcast") is Värttinä's 13th album (10th studio album).

Track listing
"Riena / Anathema" (music: Antto Varilo, lyrics: Maari Kaasinen, Johanna Virtanen) – 3:30
"Valhe / The Lie" (music: Lassi Logrén, lyrics: Susan Aho) – 4:47
"Mataleena" (music: Janne Lappalainen, lyrics: Kaasinen, traditional) – 3:54
"Synti / The Sin" (music: Varilo, lyrics: Kaasinen, trad) – 4:04
"Maaria" (music: Aho, lyrics: Timo Kiiskinen) – 4:49
"Miero / The Outcast" (music: Markku Lepistö, lyrics: Kaasinen, Lepistö, Logrén, trad) – 4:46
"Mierontie / Path of the Outcast" (music: Varilo, lyrics: Kaasinen, Aho) – 2:48
"Mustat kengät / Black Shoes" (music: Virtanen, lyrics: Kiiskinen) – 3:54
"Lupaus / The Promise" (music: Lappalainen, lyrics: Kaasinen, trad) – 5:39
"Lumotar / The Enchantress" (music: Virtanen, Logrén, lyrics: Kaasinen) – 2:23
"9 lukkoa / 9 Locks" (music: Varilo) – 2:46
"Eerama" (music: Aho, Kaasinen, Virtanen, lyrics: Kaasinen, Virtanen) – 1:59
"Vaiten valvoin / I Lay Awake" (music: Virtanen, lyrics: Virtanen) – 4:29

Personnel
Susan Aho – vocals
Mari Kaasinen – vocals
Johanna Virtanen – vocals
Janne Lappalainen – bouzouki, soprano saxophone, kaval, low whistle
Markku Lepistö – 2- and 5-row accordions, 10-string kantele
Lassi Logrén – fiddles, jouhikko, nyckelharpa, harmonium, vocal
Jaska Lukkarinen – drums, percussion, voices
Hannu Rantanen – double bass
Antto Varilo – acoustic guitars, electric guitar, guitalele, fodo guitar, saz

References

External links
Värttinä page with lyrics, English translations, sample mp3s and links to reviews

2006 albums
Värttinä albums
Real World Records albums